Alan James Forrest (born 9 September 1996) is a Scottish footballer who plays as an attacking midfielder for Scottish Premiership club Heart of Midlothian. He began his career at Ayr United, coming through the academy and making 245 appearances for The Honest Men. He would then spend two seasons with Scottish Premiership side Livingston.

He is the younger brother of Celtic and Scotland midfielder James Forrest.

Career

Club
Forrest made his debut for Ayr United in a Scottish Challenge Cup match against Queen's Park. He came off the bench to score an 89th-minute winner at Hampden Park. With this goal Forrest became Ayr's youngest ever goalscorer aged 16 years, 321 days. During the 2019–20 Scottish Championship season after scoring five goals in three league games Forrest was awarded the Scottish Championship Player of the Month for September.

Forrest signed a pre-contract deal with Livingston on 10 April 2020, making the jump from the Scottish Championship to the Scottish Premiership. Forrest made his debut for Livingston on the opening day of the 2020–21 Scottish Premiership season in a 1–0 loss against St Mirren at St Mirren Park. He scored his first goal for Livingston in a 2–2 draw against Motherwell on 12 August 2020, at Fir Park.

On 1 June 2022, it was announced that Forrest would join Scottish Premiership side Heart of Midlothian following the expiration of his Livingston contract on 10 June as a free agent on a two-year deal.

International
In 2016, Forrest made his debut for the Scotland under-21 team in a friendly against Slovakia.

Career statistics

Honours

Club
Ayr United
Scottish League One: 2017–18
Scottish Championship Play-Offs: 2015-16

Individual
Scottish Championship Player of the Month: September 2019

References

External links

1996 births
Living people
People from Prestwick
Scottish footballers
Association football midfielders
Ayr United F.C. players
Livingston F.C. players
Scottish Football League players
Scottish Professional Football League players
Scotland under-21 international footballers
Footballers from South Ayrshire
Heart of Midlothian F.C. players